NGC 6208 is an open cluster in the southern constellation of Ara. With an age of 1.17 Gigayears, it is one of the oldest known open clusters.

References

External links
 
 http://seds.org
 http://seds.org
 http://www.iop.org
 Simbad
 Image NGC 6208

NGC 6208
6208
Ara (constellation)